Hendrik Godfried Duurkoop (5 May 1736, Dornum – 27 July 1778, at sea) was a Dutch merchant-trader and VOC Opperhoofd in Japan.  During his career with the Dutch East Indies Company (the Verenigde Oost-Indische Compagnie or  VOC), he worked on Dejima, a small artificial island in the harbor of Nagasaki, Japan.

Duurkoop was born in East Frisia. In 1755 he arrived in Batavia, where his brother lived. In 1759 he was sent to the VOC trading post or "factory" at Dejima. In 1771 he was appointed bookkeeper. Duurkoop took up his duties as Opperhoofd or chief negotiant in November 1776. Early 1777 he made a hofreis to Edo.

The Japanese insisted that after one year each opperhoofd had to leave the post. During his stay in Batavia, he was infected with malaria; he died on board the ship "Huis ter Spijk" en route back to Japan in 1778. His corpse was taken to Japan and buried there on August 15. His death meant that Arend Willem Feith could not be relieved of his duties as Opperhoofd at Dejima for yet another year when Isaac Titsingh would eventually arrive in 1779.

Notes

References
 Dornum-Aurich Lutheran Church Archives. Taufregister Dornum 1736. Dornum.
 Netherlands National Archives. Scheepssoldijboek "Overnes" 1754/5. Den Haag.
 Netherlands National Archives. Rollen gekwalificeerde Civiele Dienaren 1775. .Den Haag
 Netherlands National Archives. Day register of the Factory in Japan (Dagregister van de Factorij te Japan). Den Haag.
 Screech, Timon. (2006).  Secret Memoirs of the Shoguns: Isaac Titsingh and Japan, 1779-1822. London: RoutledgeCurzon. 	;   OCLC 65177072

1736 births
1778 deaths
Dutch chiefs of factory in Japan
18th-century Dutch diplomats
East Frisians
People from Aurich (district)
Dutch people of Frisian descent